San Marco in Calcesana is a former Roman Catholic church, now deconsecrated, in Pisa, region of Tuscany, Italy. It was located next the gateway in the city walls of the road that lead to Calci, hence the name Calcesana. It housed monks of the order of St Matthew until 1387. Reconstruction began in 1508, with an altar commissioned to Giovanni della Robbia, now moved to the Camposanto Monumentale. In 1819, the church was deconsecrated, and has remained so.

Sources

Marco in Calcesana
16th-century Roman Catholic church buildings in Italy
Roman Catholic churches completed in 1508